Lorena Guado (born 26 October 1973) is an Argentine sports shooter. She competed in two events at the 1996 Summer Olympics.

References

External links
 

1973 births
Living people
Argentine female sport shooters
Olympic shooters of Argentina
Shooters at the 1996 Summer Olympics
Place of birth missing (living people)
Pan American Games medalists in shooting
Pan American Games silver medalists for Argentina
Pan American Games bronze medalists for Argentina
Shooters at the 1995 Pan American Games
Medalists at the 1995 Pan American Games
20th-century Argentine women